Meadow Lake may refer to:


Lakes

Canada
 Meadow Lake (Saskatchewan)

United States
Meadow Lake (Idaho), a glacial lake in Boise County
Meadow Lake (Queens), in Flushing Meadows-Corona Park, New York
Meadow Lake (Texas), a reservoir on the Guadalupe River

Other uses

Canada
 Meadow Lake, Saskatchewan, a city in the province's northwest
 Meadow Lake (provincial electoral district), represented in the Legislative Assembly of Saskatchewan
 Meadow Lake (electoral district), a Saskatchewan area represented in the Canadian House of Commons, 1948-1979
 Rural Municipality of Meadow Lake No. 588, Saskatchewan
 Meadow Lake Power Station, a power station in Saskatchewan
 Meadow Lake Provincial Park, a park in Saskatchewan

United States
 Meadow Lake, Nevada County, California
 Meadow Lake, New Mexico
 Meadow Lake Wind Farm, a wind farm in Indiana

See also 
 Meadow Lake Airport (disambiguation)
 Meadow Lakes (disambiguation)